SculptureCenter is a not-for-profit, contemporary art museum located in Long Island City, Queens, New York City. It was founded in 1928 as "The Clay Club" by Dorothea Denslow. In 2013, SculptureCentre attracted around 13,000 visitors.

History
Founded in Crown Heights, Brooklyn, in 1928 as The Clay Club, it was located across the street from the Brooklyn Children's Museum. Its founder, sculptor , invited local children and later other artists to share her studio.

SculptureCenter soon moved to 8 West Fourth Street in the West Village in 1932 and then, in 1948, to a carriage house at 167 East 69th Street on the Upper East Side, where it operated a school with artists’ studios. The offerings included clay and wax modeling, stone and wood carving, welding, figure studies and portraits. There were are also after-school classes for children.

In 2001, SculptureCenter's board closed both the school and the studios, sold the carriage house for $4.75 million and invested the proceeds in reinventing the organization in Queens as a European-style kunsthalle.

Program
SculptureCenter has presented works by over 750 artists through its annual exhibition program, including Turner Prize winner Charlotte Prodger and nominee Anthea Hamilton, Sanford Biggers, Nairy Baghramian, Tom Burr, Liz Glynn, Rochelle Goldberg, Camille Henrot, Leslie Hewitt, Rashid Johnson, Rita McBride, Ugo Rondinone, Katrín Sigurdardóttir, Alexandre Singh, Monika Sosnowska, Gedi Sibony, Mika Tajima, and Hugo Boss Prize winners Anicka Yi and Simone Leigh.

As a non-collecting museum, its annual program includes approximately three exhibition cycles of 1–2 commissioning programs by mid-career artists, 10–15 projects and commissions by emerging artists, and 3–6 solo and group exhibitions. SculptureCenter offers free public programs and events including artist talks, performances, film screenings, and publications.

Notable people

Alumni

Faculty and leadership 
 Armand Phillip Bartos, chairperson emeritus
Sahl Swarz

Directors
 1999–2019: Mary Ceruti
 2019–2020: Christian Rattemeyer

References

External links 
 

1928 establishments in New York City
Art museums established in 1928
Art museums and galleries in New York City
Sculpture gardens, trails and parks in New York (state)
Contemporary art galleries in the United States
Long Island City
Museums in Queens, New York